Diadegma chrysostictum is a wasp first described by Johann Friedrich Gmelin in 1790. Its range includes Sweden.
No subspecies are listed.

References

chrysostictum
Insects described in 1790
Taxa named by Johann Friedrich Gmelin